The seventh season of Tyler Perry's House of Payne began airing on September 2, 2020, and ended on January 13, 2021. It stars LaVan Davis as Curtis Payne, Cassi Davis as Ella Payne, Allen Payne as CJ Payne, Lance Gross as Calvin Payne, Demetria McKinney as Janine Payne, Larramie "Doc" Shaw as Malik Payne, China Anne McClain as Jazmine Payne and Keshia Knight Pulliam as Miranda Payne.

Episodes

References

Tyler Perry's House of Payne seasons
2020 American television seasons
2021 American television seasons